Judith C. Foss was an American politician from Maine. Foss, a Republican from Yarmouth, Maine, served in the Maine House of Representatives from 1985 to 1994.

Foss sought the Republican Party's nomination for governor in 1994. She finished in fourth place out of eight candidates.

References

Year of birth missing (living people)
Living people
People from Yarmouth, Maine
Republican Party members of the Maine House of Representatives
Women state legislators in Maine
21st-century American women